Tum Milo Toh Sahi is an Indian drama film starring Nana Patekar, Dimple Kapadia, Mohnish Bahl, Amit Behl, Suniel Shetty, Vidya Malvade, Rehan Khan and Anjana Sukhani. It was released on 2 April 2010.

Plot

After retiring as a Law Clerk, Subramaniam retreats into himself, his memories about his mother, and his small flat. He rents out a room to Bikramjeet Singh, who has been expelled from the hostel, on the condition that he cannot invite any women to even visit him. A chance encounter with 'Lucky Cafe' restaurant owner, Delshad Nanji, first antagonizes him, then he relents and becomes a regular patron along with several students. He will soon be thrust into a legal battle when 'Blue Bell' - a multinational company - decide to take over the café, and are all set to sue Delshad for encroaching on this property.

Cast
Nana Patekar as Rajagopal Subramaniam
Dimple Kapadia as Delshad Nanji/Delshad Irani
Mohnish Behl as Rahul Sood
Suniel Shetty as Amit Nagpal
Vidya Malvade as Anita Nagpal
Rehan Khan as Bikramjeet Singh
Anjana Sukhani as Shalini Kasbekar
Amit Behl as Mr. Akash Mehta
Tanisha Mukherjee in a special appearance
Raghav Sachar as himself in a special appearance
Vrajesh Hirjee as Jamshed Dinshaw “Jimmy” Irani
Smita Jaykar as The Judge
Neville Dadachanji as Manek
Sarang Soni as Aryan Reddy
Yathaarth Kansal as Ankur Khandelwal
Pushtii S as Priyanka Bhardwaj
Meher Acharya Dar as Delnaz Irani, Delshad's daughter
Farid Amiri as Harry
Yogendra as David
Surendra Pal as Brigadier
Priyesh Sagar as Bheem
Mukesh Ahuja as Hostel Warden
Narendra Gupta as Deptl store manager
Rajendra Jadhav as taxi driver
Honey Chhaya as Irani Anjuman Incharge
Kishore Nandlaskar as bald old man Fiat car owner
Srinivas Abrol as son of bald old man
Jayram Polekar as Aslam Bilal
Jagdish Chauhan as eunuch
Poonam Mishra as Dept store counter girl
Chayan Trivedi as Doctor in hospital
Megami Mehta - Cute little girl at the store

Soundtrack

Critical reception
Though critics praised the performances of Nana Patekar and Dimple Kapadia, the movie on the whole received poor ratings. Tushar Joshi of Mid Daygave it   Minty Tejpal of Bangalore Mirror said that Patekar and Kapadia are "a treat to watch" in an otherwise weak film. Gaurav Malani of The Economic Times gave it two stars, claiming it is not entertaining enough, but wrote of the leads, "Nana Patekar is in his elements inducing humour through his straight-faced expressions. Dimple Kapadia as the Parsi café owner is absolutely delightful. Together, Nana and Dimple share good chemistry and complement each other pretty well." Ajit Duara of Open magazine concluded his review saying, "Dimple is ravishing, yes, but the amateurish acting, typecasting and godawful songs let you down." Mayank Shekhar of Hindustan Times gave it anegative review. Anupama Chopra was critical of the film, the script and the story, but praised the leads. A more positive review came from The Times of India, "Watch it for the veterans' winsome act, the spirit of Mumbai and for a tale told well."

References

External links

 
Tum Milo Toh Sahi at Bollywood Hungama

2010s Hindi-language films
Films scored by Sandesh Shandilya
2010 films